Aberdeen Provincial Hospital is a Provincial government funded hospital in Aberdeen, Eastern Cape in South Africa.

The hospital departments include Emergency department, Maternity ward, O.P.D. Services, Surgical Services, Medical Services, Pharmacy, Anti-Retroviral (ARV) treatment for HIV/AIDS, Laundry and Kitchen Services.

References
Aberdeen Hospital

Hospitals in the Eastern Cape
Sarah Baartman District Municipality